The Pacem in Terris Peace and Freedom Award is a Catholic peace award which has been given annually since 1964, in commemoration of the 1963 encyclical letter  Pacem in terris (Peace on Earth) of Pope John XXIII. It is awarded "to honor a person for their achievements in peace and justice, not only in their country but in the world", and has been granted to people of many different creeds.

The award was begun in 1963 by the Davenport Catholic Interracial Council of the Diocese of Davenport in the U.S. state of Iowa. Since 1976, the award has been presented each year by the Quad Cities (Davenport and Bettendorf in southeastern Iowa, Rock Island, Moline, and East Moline in northwestern Illinois) Pacem in Terris Coalition. In 2010, sponsors of the award were the Diocese of Davenport, St. Ambrose University, Augustana College, Churches United of the Quad-Cities, Pax Christi, The Catholic Messenger, the Congregation of the Humility of Mary, the Sisters of St. Benedict, the Muslim Community of the Quad Cities, and the Sisters of St. Francis.

Six recipients have also received a Nobel Peace Prize. Two recipients are Servants of God, meaning that they are being reviewed by the Catholic Church for possible canonization as a saint, while a third, Mother Teresa, has been canonized as Saint Teresa of Calcutta.

Award winners

References

Peace awards
American awards
St. Ambrose University
Roman Catholic Diocese of Davenport
Religion in Iowa
Religion in Illinois
Davenport, Iowa
Quad Cities
Awards established in 1964
Catholic ecclesiastical decorations